Philippe Albert Joseph Stevens (30 March 1937 – 7 December 2021) was a Belgian Roman Catholic prelate. He served as Bishop of Maroua-Makolo in Cameroon from 1994 to 2014.

Biography
Born on 30 March 1937 in Quaregnon, Stevens was the seventh child in a family of nine children. Raised as a devout Catholic, he attended the Catholic University of Leuven. He earned a degree in philosophy in 1965 and three years later joined the Little Brothers of the Gospel. He was then ordained a priest on 13 July 1980 by Jacques de Bernon, who was then Bishop of Maroua-Makolo. In 1994, de Bernon retired and was succeeded by Stevens on 11 November of that year. On 5 April 2014, Pope Francis accepted his resignation on the grounds of age. During his time as Bishop, he was dedicated to interreligious dialogue between Christians and Muslims.

Stevens died on 7 December 2021, at the age of 84.

References

1937 births
2021 deaths
People from Quaregnon
Catholic University of Leuven (1834–1968) alumni
Members of Catholic orders and societies
Cameroonian Roman Catholic bishops
Belgian Roman Catholic bishops